St Andrew's Primary School may refer to:

 St Andrew's Primary School (Soham)
 St Andrew's School (Bahamas)
 St Andrew's Primary School, Kilmarnock, Scotland
 St Andrew's Primary School, Bearsden, Scotland
 St. Andrew's R.C. Primary School, Falkirk, Scotland
 St Andrew's Primary School, Cullompton, Devon, England

It may also refer to a number of primary schools in St. Andrews, Fife, Scotland